Colo-Colo is a Chilean men's football club based in Macul, Santiago.

Colo-Colo may also refer to:

 Colo-colo (condiment), a spicy Indonesian condiment
 Colo Colo (mythology), a rat-like creature from Mapuche mythology
 Colo-Colo (women), a Chilean women's football club
 Colo-Colo B, a Chilean men's football team
 Chilean ship Colo Colo, a list of ships

See also
 
 Colo (disambiguation)